Dr. José Marcó del Pont (1851 – 11 July 1917) was a philatelist who was one of the "Fathers of Philately" entered on the Roll of Distinguished Philatelists in 1921.

References

1851 births
1917 deaths
Fellows of the Royal Philatelic Society London
Recipients of the Lindenberg Medal
Argentine philatelists
Fathers of philately